Franco Orozco (born 9 January 2002) is an Argentine professional footballer who plays as a left winger for Lanús.

Club career
Orozco progressed through the Lanús youth system. He was promoted into the club's senior squad under manager Luis Zubeldía towards the end of 2020, initially featuring in pre-season action which saw him score in a win over Gimnasia y Esgrima on 21 October. A week later, Orozco made his competitive first-team debut in a 3–2 victory over São Paulo in the Copa Sudamericana; replacing Braian Aguirre early in the second half. The winger did the same on 31 October in a Copa de la Liga Profesional loss at home to Boca Juniors. He scored his first senior goal at the Estadio Mario Alberto Kempes against Talleres on 9 November.

Orozco scored twice in a Copa Sudamericana round of sixteen second leg victory over Bolívar on 2 December 2020. After further Copa de la Liga goals against Newell's Old Boys and Rosario Central, the winger netted on his Copa Argentina debut on 23 February against Primera C Metropolitana's Real Pilar.

International career
Orozco represented Argentina at U15 and U17 level; appearing in over thirty matches in total. For the U15s, he scored one goal (versus Paraguay) as they won the 2017 South American U-15 Championship on home soil. For the U17s, Orozco scored two goals in his sole appearance at the 2019 FIFA U-17 World Cup against Tajikistan; having played seven times earlier that year at the South American U-17 Championship in Peru.

Career statistics
.

Honours
Argentina U15
South American U-15 Championship: 2017

Notes

References

External links

2002 births
Living people
People from Ezeiza, Buenos Aires
Argentine footballers
Argentina youth international footballers
Association football forwards
Argentine Primera División players
Club Atlético Lanús footballers
Sportspeople from Buenos Aires Province